The subdivision of West Central German into a series of dialects, according to the differing extent of the High German consonant shift, is particularly pronounced. It known as the Rhenish fan because on the map of dialect boundaries, the lines form a fan shape. Here, no fewer than eight isoglosses, named after places on the Rhine River, run roughly west to east. They partially merge into a simpler system of boundaries in East Central German. The table on the right lists the isoglosses (bold) and the main resulting dialects (italics), arranged from north to south.

Chart

References

History of the German language
Central German languages